The 1989 Individual Speedway Junior World Championship was the 13th edition of the World motorcycle speedway Under-21 Championships. The event was won by Gert Handberg of Denmark.

World final
August 24, 1989
 Lonigo, Pista Speedway

References

1989
Individual Junior
Individual
Speedway competitions in Italy